The Fell Exhibition Slate Mine is a former slate mine in Germany located about 20 km east of Trier and about 60 km east of Luxembourg City near the villages of Fell and Thomm. The exhibition mine is open to visitors every day from April to October. It consists of two roof slate mines from the early 20th century that are situated one above the other, a slate mining trail, and a mining museum.

Special attractions

Mine underground 

The Barbara-Hoffnung Exhibition Mine in the Nossern Valley, between Fell and Thomm, consists of two typical roof slate mines from the turn of the century, situated one above the other. The upper gallery, Hoffnung ("Hope"), was first mentioned in documents dating from 1850, and the lower gallery, Barbara, in documents dating from 1908. Both mines are connected by 100m of stairwell.
The guided underground tour takes an hour. 
During the winter months, slate miners saw no sunlight for months on end. Seventy metres below ground visitors witness the sun rise in a breathtaking chamber.

Since 1994, the Fell community, aided by public support (including grants by the European Community), has restored two former roofing slate mines in Fell and converted them into an exhibition mine. In the course of these developments, two especially interesting mines, the Barbara Mine, which is situated approximately 25m higher than the second, Hoffnung (Hope), were connected by a sloping tunnel. Driving was initiated from the Barbara stoping level and leads to the fourth chamber of the Hope Mine. The exhibition mine was opened to the public in 1997. Since the exhibition mine has been opened, visitors have been able to tour the extensive tunnels, drifts, imposing chambers, chutes and mighty pack walls and get an idea of the hard and dangerous work of a slate miner. Figures on display in the mine, realistically illustrate the hard work of miners in a slate mine.

The slate mining trail 

The trail leads through the scenic Nossern Valley, past relics of historic slate mining: imposing, terraced dumps, old mine cars, trails formerly used to transport the slate and now nearly completely overgrown, singular and quaint entry tunnels, all of which are a witness to the mining industry and past effigies of Saint Barbara, patron saint and helper in times of need for the miners.

The layout of the Slate Mining Trail was conceived in such a manner, that everyone, depending on their level of fitness and interest, can plan their own individual route.

In front of the entry tunnels to the mines, ten slate roofed information boards are to be found. The slate roofing was donated and completed by the Rathscheck Schieferbergbau company, Mayen and lovingly designed in different roofing styles.

With the mine map on the information board, visitors can gain insight into the size and complexity of each mine system. There is also information on the history of each mine, the periods of operation and the number of galleries etc.

Museum mine and wine 
Adjacent to the exhibition mine, visitors will find a small documentation centre, "Mine and Wine", which exhibits curious and rare slate mining and wine-making tools. A non-stop video presentation illustrates modern state-of-the-art slate mining in Europe (length approx. 12 minutes) taking place in the Rathscheck slate mine near Mayen. The small museum also has an impressive statue of Saint Barbara from 1897 on display.

Traditions 

The most important bearer of the mining tradition in the former mining towns of Fell and Thomm are the Fell  Miners’ Band and the Glück-Auf Thomm Miners' Band, 1927 e.V., both established in 1955, but with a traceable history going back to 1871.

The Fell Buglers have maintained the tradition of bugling for the hunt for years. If weather and time permits, the buglers practise on Sunday mornings at the Fell Exhibition Mine and signal for the hunt. Anyone interested in listening to the Hubertus Marsch ("St. Hubert's March"), the Jäger aus Kurpfalz ("Hunter from the Palatinate") or the Parforce March is welcome to join the morning pint on Sundays at the Fell Exhibition Mine. The traditional airs Sau tot! ("Boar Dead!"), Hirsch tot! ("Stag Dead!"), Hase tot! ("Hare Dead!"), Begrüßug ("Welcome"), Sammeln der Jäger ("Gathering of the Hunters"), Jagd vorbei ("The Hunt is Over") and other melodies from the hunt are part of the Fell Buglers repertoire.

Every year on the second Sunday in Advent (the Sunday following the Saint's Day of Saint Barbara on 4 December) a traditional parade of the Fell Miners’ Band, the Bergparade, takes place.

Every two years in the time leading up to Christmas the Friends of the Exhibition Mine organise a matins in the mine for their members. Participants descend into the mine by the light of candles and pit lamps alone. At specific points in the mine, ex-miners describe their hard work while contemporary witnesses talk about their wartime experiences. They relate to a time, when the mines were bunkers and homes for the citizens of Fell and Thomm. Musical contributions, prayers and poems are presented in honour of St Barbara.

External links 

 Fell Exhibition Slate Mine website

Slate mines in Germany
Museums in Rhineland-Palatinate
Underground mines in Germany
Mining museums in Germany
Show mines
Articles containing video clips